
The Worthington Glacier is a  valley glacier located adjacent to Thompson Pass in the southeastern mainland section of the U.S. state of Alaska.

Geography 

The Worthington Glacier State Recreation Site, a  roadside park operated by the state of Alaska, offers a view of the glacier, and it is acclaimed as one of the remaining U.S. glaciers that is accessible by paved highway. Like most of Alaska's glaciers, this glacier has been steadily retreating for the last 150 years, but not as dramatically as many others.

See also
 Mount Billy Mitchell (Chugach Mountains)
 Girls Mountain

References

External links

 Worthington Glacier National Park Service

Glaciers of Alaska
Glaciers of Chugach Census Area, Alaska
Glaciers of Unorganized Borough, Alaska
National Natural Landmarks in Alaska